Discoplastis is a genus of algae belonging to the family Phacidae.

The species of this genus are found in Europe, Northern America, Southeastern Asia and Australia.

Species:
 Discoplastis spathirhyncha (Skuja) Triemer

References

Algae